Thomas Waldo Story (December 9, 1854 – October 23, 1915) was an American sculptor, art critic, poet and literary editor, living for most of his life in Rome, Italy.

Life

Story was born in Paris in 1854 to the sculptor William Wetmore Story, son of early Supreme Court justice Joseph Story.

While his parents lived in Rome, Waldo was educated in England at Eton College and at Christ Church, Oxford. Afterwards, he moved to Rome himself where he shared a studio with his father and, after the latter's death in 1895, took over his lease of an apartment in the Palazzo Barberini.

In 1883 Waldo Story married Ada Maud Broadwood (1856-1932), the eldest child of Thomas Capel Broadwood and Mary Davidson Hennin. In 1912, he was married for a second time to opera singer Bessie Pickens Abott.

Waldo Story frequently stayed in England where he was friends with James Abbott McNeill Whistler. He is best known for his Fountain of Love in the grounds of Cliveden, Buckinghamshire.

He died at his home in New York City in 1915.

Gallery

References

External links
 

1855 births
1915 deaths
Literary editors
20th-century American sculptors
20th-century American male artists
19th-century American sculptors
19th-century American male artists
American male sculptors
People educated at Eton College
Alumni of Christ Church, Oxford